Shemmy Mayembe (born 22 November 1997) is a Zambian footballer who plays as a defender for the Zambia national football team.

References

External links
 
 

1997 births
Living people
ZESCO United F.C. players
Zambian footballers
Zambia international footballers
Zambian expatriate footballers
Association football fullbacks
2019 Africa U-23 Cup of Nations players
FC Mynai players
Ukrainian Premier League players
Expatriate footballers in Ukraine
Zambian expatriate sportspeople in Ukraine